, better known under the stage name , was a Japanese actress best known for starring in Akai Giwaku, Kishibe no Album, and the Ultra Series franchise.

Biography
Chisako Hara was born on 6 January 1936 in Takaoka Town (now Tosa, Kōchi).

During the 1970s, she became famous for her intense role in Akai Series.

In the 2017 book "The Movie History of the Heretic New Toho", Hara discussed her membership in New Toho with Noriko Kitazawa and others.

She was the wife of Ultraman director Akio Jissoji. Hara died at the age of 84 on 19 January 2020 in a Tokyo Metropolis hospital due to maxillary sarcoma. Her first-born daughter, actress , is set to be the chief mourner at her funeral.

Selected filmography

Television
Akai Series
Alibi no kanata e
Drama D Mode
Furinryokō no wana
Hanamura Daisuke
Hinata Bokko
Itsuwari no Hanazono
Jakō
Jukeisha Shissō
Kenji Kasumi Yūko
Kishibe no Album
Kyūkyūkyūmei Center
Let's Go Onsen
Michidzure
Pretty Girl
Pu Pu Pu
Rinshō Shinrishi
Uranaishi Suzuko

Film
Asakiyunumishi
Dark Water
Fudōfukutsu
Girl of Dark
Gishiki'''HaruuraraLily FestivalMurder on D StreetPale FlowerThe Lost AlibiThe Summer of the UbumeTokyo TowerTsuribaka NikkiWait and See''

References

1936 births
2020 deaths
Japanese film actresses
Japanese television actresses
20th-century Japanese actresses
21st-century Japanese actresses
People from Tosa, Kōchi